Pendleton County Poor Farm is a historic poor farm house located at Upper Tract, Pendleton County, West Virginia. It was built about 1900, and is a large, -story frame building.  It features a full width front porch and hipped roof with dormers.

It was listed on the National Register of Historic Places in 1986.

References

Houses on the National Register of Historic Places in West Virginia
Houses completed in 1900
Houses in Pendleton County, West Virginia
Public housing in West Virginia
Poor farms
National Register of Historic Places in Pendleton County, West Virginia
American Foursquare architecture in West Virginia